James Robert Lynch  (born 11 September 1947) is a New Zealand cartoonist and conservationist.

Lynch was born in 1947 in Whangarei. He grew up on a farm in Hukerenui.

His first cartoons were published in the Taranaki Daily News in 1979 (appearing weekly until 1986) and he produced fortnightly cartoons for the New Zealand Times from 1981 to 1985. He was the runner-up in the New Zealand Cartoonist of the Year category at the Qantas Press Awards in 1983. Lynch's cartoons appeared under the name 'James' because "I didn't want to go to my boss and ask if I could have secondary employment as a political cartoonist".

Lynch is possibly better known as a conservationist and founder of Zealandia. He was the President of the Wellington Branch of Forest and Bird from 1991.

In the 2001 Queen's Birthday Honours, Lynch was awarded the Queen's Service Medal for community service.

In 2022, Lynch was commissioned by Wellington Regional Council to produce a feasibility study of establishing a wildlife sanctuary in the Wainuiomata Water Collection Area. The study found that the project was "technically and practically feasible". The name given to the proposed sanctuary is Puketahā.

References

External links 
 James Lynch on DigitalNZ

1947 births
Living people
New Zealand cartoonists
New Zealand conservationists
Recipients of the Queen's Service Medal